This is a list of episodes from Quincy, M.E., an American crime-investigation and mystery series. It was originally broadcast on NBC from October 3, 1976, to May 11, 1983. The show stars Jack Klugman as a medical examiner in Los Angeles who solves crimes and deals with social issues of the time.

Over the course of eight seasons, 148 episodes were produced.

Series overview
As of this writing, all eight seasons of this series have been released on DVD.

Episodes

Season 1 (1976–77)

Season 2 (1977)

Season 3 (1977–78)

Season 4 (1978–79)

Season 5 (1979–80)

Season 6 (1980–81)

Season 7 (1981–82)

Season 8 (1982–83)

References

External links
 

Quincy, M.E.